= Piters Aloizs Ragauss =

Businessman and philanthropist from the United States with Latvian descent

Pīters Aloizs Ragaušs
- Occupation: Businessperson

Pīters Aloizs Ragaušs (born in 1957) is a businessman born in the U.S. state of Michigan.

He is a member of the board of Friends of the University of Latvia and the Baltic-American Freedom Foundation. He was also the Honorary Consul of Latvia in Texas in 2018.

== Wealth and philanthropy ==
Ragaušs is part of the circle of patrons of The University of Latvia "Ceļamaize" Scholarship from 2019 to 2020.
